Argentina is located at a longitude that would naturally put it in the UTC−04:00 or UTC−05:00 time zone; however, it actually uses the UTC−03:00 time zone. Argentina determines whether to observe daylight saving time on a year-by-year basis, and individual provinces may opt out of the federal decision. At present, Argentina does not observe daylight saving time.

The Argentine Hydrographic Service maintains the official national time.

History
The first official standardization took place on 31 October 1894.
The official time switched between UTC−04:00 and UTC−03:00 from 1920 to 1969, and then between UTC−03:00 and UTC−02:00 from 1974 to 1993. Historically, some or all of Argentina has observed daylight saving time in summer 1989–1990 to summer 1992–1993 and again in 2007−2009. On 7 March 1993, it was fixed at UTC−03:00, called Argentina Time (ART)

IANA time zone database
In the file zone.tab of the IANA time zone database Argentina has the following zones:
 America/Argentina/Buenos_Aires – Buenos Aires (BA, CF)
 America/Argentina/Cordoba – most locations (CD, CC, CR, ER, FO, MN, SF)
 America/Argentina/Salta (SA, LP, NQ, RN)
 America/Argentina/Jujuy – Jujuy (JY)
 America/Argentina/Tucuman – Tucuman (TM)
 America/Argentina/Catamarca – Catamarca (CT), Chubut (CH)
 America/Argentina/La Rioja – La Rioja (LR)
 America/Argentina/San Juan – San Juan (SJ)
 America/Argentina/Mendoza – Mendoza (MZ)
 America/Argentina/San Luis – San Luis (SL)
 America/Argentina/Rio Gallegos – Santa Cruz (SC)
 America/Argentina/Ushuaia – Tierra del Fuego (TF)
 America/Argentina/Santiago_del_Estero (SE)

References

 tz database – The tz database contains an extensive history of time zone and daylight saving time changes, with references to official sources for changes to time zones, for Argentina and the rest of the world.

External links
 Observatorio Naval Buenos Aires: National time

 
Time in South America